Biryuchenskoye is a rural locality (a selo) in Kashirskoye Rural Settlement, Kashirsky District, Voronezh Oblast, Russia. The population was 148 as of 2010. There are 4 streets.

Geography 
Biryuchenskoye is located 7 km northwest of Kashirskoye (the district's administrative centre) by road. Kashirskoye is the nearest rural locality.

References 

Rural localities in Kashirsky District, Voronezh Oblast